San Vicente, officially the Municipality of San Vicente, is a 5th class municipality in the province of Camarines Norte, Philippines. According to the 2020 census, it has a population of 12,579 people.

Geography

Barangays
San Vicente is politically subdivided into 9 barangays.

 Asdum
 Cabanbanan
 Calabagas
 Fabrica
 Iraya Sur
 Man-Ogob
 Poblacion District I (Silangan/Barangay 1)
 Poblacion District II (Kanluran/Barangay 2)
 San Jose - formerly Iraya Norte

Climate

Demographics

Economy

Tourism
The Mananap Falls is approximately 20–25 ft tall, tucked inside the thick forest and mountains. The water was ice cold there is a small raft tied which will lead you near the falls and a ladder to get to the top of the falls. There is a jumping point as well.

References

External links
 [ Philippine Standard Geographic Code]
Philippine Census Information

Municipalities of Camarines Norte